Tatiana Ignatieva (born 11 June 1974) is a former Belarusian tennis player.

Ignatieva won one singles title ($75k) on the ITF Circuit during her career. On 9 August 1993, she reached her best singles ranking of world No. 91. On 12 August 1991, she peaked at No. 570 in the WTA doubles rankings.

Ignatieva has a 13–11 record for the Belarus Fed Cup team and appeared in the main draw of all four Grand Slam tournaments.

ITF finals

Singles (1–2)

Doubles (0–1)

Junior Grand Slam finals

Girls' singles

Girls' doubles

References
 
 
 

1974 births
Living people
Tennis players from Minsk
Belarusian female tennis players
Soviet female tennis players